This is a list of German television related events from 1981.

Events
28 February - Lena Valaitis is selected to represent Germany at the 1981 Eurovision Song Contest with her song "Johnny Blue". She is selected to be the twenty-sixth German Eurovision entry during Ein Lied für Dublin held at the BR Studios in Munich.

Debuts

ARD
 27 March – Tour de Ruhr (1981)
 29 July – Kumpel mit Chauffeur (1981)
 19 September – Geantwortet wird immer (1981)
 29 September –  (1981–1984)
 14 October – Die Knapp-Familie (1981–1983)
 16 October – Cockpit (1981)
 27 October – Die Laurents (1981)
 3 November – Drunter und Drüber (1981)
 16 November – Der Gerichtsvollzieher (1981)
 Unknown – Kintopp Kintopp (1981)

ZDF
 3 January –  
 Sternensommer (1981)
 Ein zauberhaftes Biest (1981)
 18 January –  Tod eines Schülers (1981)
 30 January –  Tegtmeier klärt auf (1981–1983)
 5 February –  Erben will gelernt sein  (1981)
 14 February – Wetten, dass..? (1981–2014)
 2 April –  Frau über vierzig (1981)
 11 May –  Der Fuchs von Övelgönne (1981)
 11 September –  Ein Fall für zwei (1981–present)
 17 September –  Onkel & Co (1981)
 20 September –   (1981)
 22 November –  Das Traumschiff (1981–present)
 25 December –  Silas (1981)

DFF
 1 January –   Das große Abenteuer des Kaspar Schmeck (1981)
 2 January –   Hochhausgeschichten (1981)
 17 April –   Verflucht und geliebt (1981)
 26 June –  Ein Engel im Taxi (1981)
 23 October – Jockei Monika (1981)
 19 December –  Feuerdrachen (1981)
 25 December – Der ungebetene Gast (1981)

International
30 June -  Dallas (1978-1991) (Das Erste)

Armed Forces Network
 Hill Street Blues (1981-1987)

Television shows

1950s
Tagesschau (1952–present)

1960s
 heute (1963-present)

1970s
heute-journal (1978-present)
Tagesthemen (1978-present)

Ending this year
11 November - Sun, Wine and Hard Nuts (1977-1981)

Births
14 November - Janin Reinhardt, TV host & actress

Deaths